Leucorhodia is a genus of moths in the subfamily Arctiinae. It contains the single species Leucorhodia ragua, which is found in Guatemala.

References

Natural History Museum Lepidoptera generic names catalog

Lithosiini